Antarctospira principalis is a species of sea snail, a marine gastropod mollusk in the family Borsoniidae.

Description

Distribution
This species occurs in the Ross Sea, Antarctica.

References

 Thiele, Johannes. "Die antarktischen schnecken und muscheln." Deutsche Südpolar-Expedition (1901–1903) 13 (1912): 183–286
 Powell A.W.B. (1960) Antarctic and Subantarctic Mollusca; Records of the Auckland Institute and Museum Vol. 5, No. 3/4
 Engl, W. (2012). Shells of Antarctica. Hackenheim: Conchbooks. 402 pp.

External links
   Bouchet P., Kantor Yu.I., Sysoev A. & Puillandre N. (2011) A new operational classification of the Conoidea. Journal of Molluscan Studies 77: 273–308
 Kantor Y.I., Harasewych M.G. & Puillandre N. (2016). A critical review of Antarctic Conoidea (Neogastropoda). Molluscan Research. 36(3): 153–206
 

principalis
Gastropods described in 1912